Anabasis (from Greek ana = "upward", bainein = "to step or march") is an expedition from a coastline into the interior of a country. Anabase and Anabasis may also refer to:

History
 Anabasis Alexandri (Anabasis of Alexander), a history of the campaigns of Alexander the Great by Greek historian Arrian
 Anabasis (Xenophon), a history of the expedition of Cyrus the Younger by Greek writer Xenophon
 Siberian Anabasis, a literary name for the Czechoslovak Legions' transit through Siberia during the Russian Civil War, in reference to the epic of Xenophon

Poetry and fiction
, a 1924 poem by Saint-John Perse
 Anabasis, a 1930 translation of Saint-John Perse's poem by T. S. Eliot
 Anabasis, poem by Paul Celan, published 1963 in "Die Niemandsrose"
 Anabasis, a 1994 novel by Ellen Gilchrist
  Anabasis, a novel of Hellenistic Afghanistan and India by Geoffrey Storey. A work of historical fiction set in Bactria

Music
 Anabasis, a fantasy music act on Waerloga Records
 The Anabasis, an American progressive metal band featuring Ryo Okumoto
 "Anabasis (Xenophontis)", a song from the album Killing with a Smile by Australian band Parkway Drive

Nature
 Anabasis (moth), a genus of snout moths in the family Pyralidae
 Anabasis (plant), a genus of desert shrubs in family Chenopodioideae
 Anabatic wind, a wind which blows up a steep slope or mountain side

See also
 Anabasii, couriers of antiquity
 Katabasis, a trip from the interior down to the coast